The Eumenophorinae are a subfamily of tarantula spiders (family Theraphosidae). They are known from genera distributed across Sub-Saharan Africa, the south of the Arabian peninsula, Madagascar and its associated islands, and parts of India.

Distribution 
At about 158-160 million years ago (Mya), Gondwana split up and the Indo-Madagascan plate drifted away from the rest of the super continent. At around 84-86 Mya, India split from Madagascar and drifted into Eurasia (66-55 Mya), to its current position. Therefore, all fauna in Gondwana (such as the Eumenophorinae) would be distributed on all three land masses.

Characteristics 
The Eumenophorinae have stridulatory spike setae on the coxae of all legs, and a "comb" of stiffened setae on the palpal femur. In 2005, Richard Gallon described the monotypic genus Mascaraneus, which lacks the stridulatory spike setae.

Taxonomy
The monophyly of the Eumenophorinae has been confirmed in a number of molecular phylogenetic studies. However, these have included relatively few of the genera that have been placed in the subfamily at one time or another. A 2014 study included Anoploscelus and Phoneyusa. A 2018 study included Hysterocrates, Monocentropus and Pelinobius.

Genera 
Genera that have been placed in the subfamily Eumenophorinae by various sources include:

Annandaliella Hirst, 1909
Anoploscelus Pocock, 1897
Batesiella Pocock, 1903
Encyocrates Simon, 1892
Eumenophorus Pocock, 1897
Heterophrictus Pocock, 1900
Heteroscodra Pocock, 1900
Hysterocrates Simon, 1892
Loxomphalia Simon, 1889
Loxoptygus Simon, 1903
Mascaraneus Gallon, 2005
Monocentropus Pocock, 1897
Myostola Simon, 1903
Neoheterophrictus Siliwal & Raven, 2012
Pelinobius Karsch, 1885 (as Citharischius Pocock, 1900)
Phoneyusa Karsch, 1884
Plesiophrictus Pocock, 1899
Sahydroaraneus Mirza & Sanap, 2014
Stromatopelma Karsch, 1881

References 

Theraphosidae
Spider subfamilies
Taxa named by R. I. Pocock